Esus, Hesus, or Aisus was a Brittonic and Gaulish god known from two monumental statues and a line in Lucan's Bellum civile.

Name 
T. F. O'Rahilly derives the theonym Esus, as well as Aoibheall, Éibhleann, Aoife, and other names, from the Proto-Indo-European root *eis-, which he glosses as 'well-being, energy, passion'.

The personal name Esunertus ('strength of Esus') occurs in a number of Gallo-Roman inscriptions, including one votive inscription dedicated to Mercury, while other theophoric given names such as Esugenus ('born from Esus') are also attested. It is possible that the Esuvii of Gaul, in the area of present-day Normandy, took their name from this deity.

Imagery
The two sculptures where Esus appears are the Pillar of the Boatmen from among the Parisii, on which Esus is identified by name, and a pillar from Trier among the Treveri with similar iconography. In both of these, Esus is portrayed cutting branches from trees with his axe. Esus is accompanied, on different panels of the Pillar of the Boatmen, alongside Tarvos Trigaranus (the ‘bull with three cranes’), Jupiter, Vulcan, and other gods.

Written sources
A well-known section in Lucan's Bellum civile (61–65 CE) refers to gory sacrifices offered to a triad of Celtic deities: Teutates, Hesus (an aspirated form of Esus), and Taranis. Variant spellings, or readings, of the name Esus in the manuscripts of Lucan include Hesus, Aesus, and Haesus. Among a pair of later commentators on Lucan's work, one identifies Teutates with Mercury and Esus with Mars. According to the Berne Commentary on Lucan, human victims were sacrificed to Esus by being tied to a tree and flogged to death.

The Gallic medical writer Marcellus of Bordeaux may offer another textual reference to Esus in his De medicamentis, a compendium of pharmacological preparations written in Latin in the early 5th century and the sole source for several Celtic words. The work contains a magico-medical charm decipherable as Gaulish which appears to invoke the aid of Esus (spelled Aisus) in curing throat trouble.

Association with rivers

Esus is known from two monumental statues:
 Paris, France –   " Pillar of the Boatmen " . 

 Trier, Germany – Stone pillar with similar iconography to Pillar of the Boatmen. 

Both sources show consistent symbolic images of riverside scenery that have been interpreted to  include  willow trees and wetland birds that might be  egret's or  cranes.  

The iconography suggests an association with wetland's, water margin and rivers.

River names

River names that may be derived from Esus:

 The river Aesis, now known as the Esino river in the Marche region of Italy.   

 The unidentified river Aesius in the Roman province of Bithynia and Pontus (modern-day Turkey).

Interpretations
John Arnott MacCulloch summarized the state of scholarly interpretations of Esus in 1911 as follows:

James McKillop cautions that Arbois de Jublainville's identification of Esus with Cú Chulainn "now seems ill-founded".

Jan de Vries finds grounds of comparison between Esus and Odin, both being patrons of sailors sometimes associated with Mercury to whom human victims were said to be sacrificed by hanging.

Miranda Green suggests that the willow-tree that Esus hews may symbolize "the Tree of Life [...] with its associations of destruction and death in winter and rebirth in the spring". She further suggests that the cranes might represent "the flight of the soul (perhaps the soul of the tree)".

In Neo-Druidism
The 18th century Druidic revivalist Iolo Morganwg identified Esus with Jesus on the strength of the similarity of their names. He also linked them both with Hu Gadarn, writing:

This identification is still made in certain Neo-Druidic circles. Modern scholars consider the resemblance between the names Esus and Jesus to be coincidental.

See also
Lugus

References

Notes

Citations

Sources

External links

Esus, including photographs and a capitulation of primary and secondary source material.
A contemporary Dutch-language story of struggle between Esus and Tarvos Trigaranus

Agricultural gods
Celtic gods
Gaulish gods
War gods
Sacrifice